Odo (or Eudes) (also Odon or Odonus) was the count of Toulouse from 872 to 918 or 919, when he died.

He was a son of Raymond I of Toulouse and Bertha, or of Bernard II of Toulouse.

He married Garsenda, daughter of Ermengol of Albi, and probably had three children. His sons were Raymond II, whom he associated in the countship by giving him Rouergue (before 898), and Ermengol, who inherited that same province. It has been suggested for onomastic reasons that Odo was the father of Garsenda, wife of Wilfred II of Barcelona.

Notes

Sources

919 deaths
Counts of Toulouse
Year of birth unknown
House of Rouergue
9th-century people from West Francia